Gareth Mark Andrew (born 27 December 1983) is an English cricketer who most recently played for Hampshire. He is a fast medium bowler and left-handed batsman. He toured Australia with the England Under-17 team in 1997, made his debut for the Somerset 2nd XI in 1999 and played for the Somerset Cricket Board in the Nat West Bank Trophy in 2000 and the C&G Trophy in 2001. He made his first-class debut for Somerset in 2003 and also played that season for England Under-19 against South Africa Under-19.

After being restricted to the Somerset Second XI for the 2007 season, Andrew agreed to move to Worcestershire for 2008. There his performances with the bat improved, added to some impressive knocks in the shorter format game. In his first season, he was the leading wicket taker in NatWest Pro40 Division 1 with 12 wickets.

On 4 January 2011, it was confirmed that Andrew faced 6 months out following a knee operation, Andrew was expected to go in for minor surgery but the injury proved far worse than first feared.

References

External links

1983 births
Living people
People from Yeovil
English cricketers
Somerset Cricket Board cricketers
Somerset cricketers
Worcestershire cricketers
Canterbury cricketers
Hampshire cricketers
Oxfordshire cricketers